Nizdemoria is a village in Kamrup, situated in north bank of river Brahmaputra .

Transport
Nizdemoria is accessible through National Highway 31. All major private commercial vehicles ply between Nizdemoria and nearby towns.

See also
 Batsor
 Nawkata

References

Villages in Kamrup district